Proposition 4 of 1911 (or Senate Constitutional Amendment No. 8) was an amendment of the Constitution of California that granted women the right to vote in the state for the first time. Senate Constitutional Amendment No. 8 was sponsored by Republican State Senator Charles W. Bell from Pasadena, California.  It was adopted by the California State Legislature and approved by voters in a referendum held as part of a special election on October 10, 1911. 

An earlier attempt to enfranchise women had been rejected by California voters in 1896, but in 1911 California became the sixth U.S. state to adopt the reform. Nine years later in 1920, women's suffrage was constitutionally recognized at the federal level by the Nineteenth Amendment to the U.S. Constitution. This amendment prohibited both the federal government and all of the states from denying women the right to vote.

Proposition 4 Election 

Proposition 4 was narrowly approved by California voters with 50.7 percent support.  Election evening results appeared to indicate that Proposition 4 would be defeated as there was strong opposition from the San Francisco Bay Area.  However, late returns from the agricultural and rural parts of the state overcame majority opposition from Bay Area cities such as San Francisco and Oakland.

The county with the highest level of support for Proposition 4 was the rural Modoc County (70.5% support).  The county with the lowest level of support for Proposition 4 was San Francisco County (38.1% support).  Other notable counties voting against giving women the right to vote included Marin County (41.6% support), San Mateo County (44.5% support), and Alameda County (45.4% support).

The ballot argument in favor of Proposition 4 was written by Republican State Senator C.W. Bell and Republican Assemblyman H.G. Cattell, both from southern California.  The ballot argument against Proposition 4 was written by Democratic State Senator J.B. Sanford from northern California.

Controversial Editorials and Opinion Pieces Against Women’s Suffrage 

In 1911, there were several editorials and opinion pieces published by the Los Angeles Times against women’s suffrage, including Proposition 4.

A Los Angeles Times editorial dated January 21, 1911, stated that “women are incapable of physically dominating men.  By their inferior physical strength they are unable to compete on an equal basis in any line of endeavor where ability is determined by sheer bodily prowess.  All positions of physical power - such as in our police forces, our armies and our navies - will necessarily be filled by men.  In other words the enforcement of all law must inevitably rest with men. No law or ordinance could be effectually upheld except through the willingness of men to uphold it.  And no matter what words were written on the statute books of any State, if the physical power (which is the masculine power) behind it were withdrawn, the law would immediately become void and impotent. Therefore in equal suffrage we have the spectacle of women desiring to pass laws which they are physically incapable of upholding, and laws which they admit the men do not want.”

A Los Angeles Times editorial dated August 19, 1911, stated that: “Possession of the ballot will not help woman, socially or industrially. It will make exactions upon her time and strength.  It will invade the home and destroy its charm. It will not result in wiser laws or better government.”

A Los Angeles Times editorial dated September 22, 1911, stated that:  “The working man - whether he be a Republican, a Democrat or a Socialist - who walks along Broadway or Spring Street on Saturday afternoon and sees thousands of fashionably-attired girls and women of mature age parading in autos and making woman-suffrage speeches says to himself, ‘Are these butterflies to be entrusted with the task of making laws for me?’”  The editorial also stated that “[t]he Times opposes woman suffrage because it does not believe in either the justice or the expediency of burdening the women of California with the duty of voting.”

In a Los Angeles Times opinion piece dated October 1, 1911, Democratic State Senator J.B. Sanford, who was Chairman of the Democratic Caucus of California at the time, called women’s suffrage a “disease,” a “political hysteria,”  a “cruel and intolerable burden,” and a “backward step in the progress of civilization.”  In the same opinion piece published by the Los Angeles Times, Democratic State Senator Sanford also used homophobic language in writing the following about certain classes of people who advocate women’s suffrage:  “It is the mannish female politician and the little effeminate, sissy man, and the woman who is dissatisfied with her lot and sorry that she was born a woman.”

1896 Rejection of Women’s Suffrage by California Voters 

During the November 3, 1896 General Election, California voters rejected Constitutional Amendment No. 6 which would have given women the right to vote.  The suffrage amendment was defeated by a double-digit margin with 44.6 percent support.  Notable counties voting against giving women the right to vote included San Francisco County (26.1% support), San Mateo County (29.9% support), Marin County (30.8% support), Contra Costa County (37.7% support), Sacramento County (40.0% support), Sonoma County (40.4% support), Alameda County (40.7% support), and Santa Clara County (49.0% support).

Both the Los Angeles Times and the San Francisco Chronicle opposed Constitutional Amendment No. 6 which would have given women the right to vote.

Progressive Era of Reforms 

Women's suffrage was a part of the Progressive Era of reforms. On the same election day that Proposition 4 was approved, voters enacted the modern system of direct democracy in California, by approving Proposition 7, which introduced the initiative and the optional referendum powers, and Proposition 8, which introduced the recall of public officials.

Constitutional Suffrage Reforms Excluded 

While Proposition 4 gave women the right to vote in California, the proposition did not alter the existing discriminatory provisions in the California Constitution limiting the right to vote, including prohibiting natives of China from voting, prohibiting the mentally disabled from voting, and prohibiting persons from voting who were unable to read the Constitution in the English language and write their name.

See also
List of California suffragists
Timeline of the women's suffrage movement in California
Women's suffrage in California
Women's suffrage in the United States

References

External links
San Francisco History 1900-1950 
"Argument Against Senate Constitutional Amendment No. 8"

1911 California ballot propositions
1911
California suffrage
Suffrage referendums
Feminism in California
Feminism and history
Voting in the United States
Women's rights in the United States